The 1997 Southern Miss Golden Eagles football team represented the University of Southern Mississippi in the 1997 NCAA Division I-A football season. The Golden Eagles were led by eighth-year head coach Jeff Bower and played their home games at M. M. Roberts Stadium. In their second year in the Conference USA, they claimed their second-straight conference championship with a 6–0 C-USA record and a 9–3 record overall. They were invited to the 1997 Liberty Bowl, where they defeated Pittsburgh, 41–7. In the final AP and Coaches Polls of the season, the Golden Eagles were ranked 19th, which was the first ranked finish in school history.

Schedule

References

Southern Miss
Southern Miss Golden Eagles football seasons
Conference USA football champion seasons
Liberty Bowl champion seasons
Southern Miss Golden Eagles football